Best Actor is a 2010 Malayalam-language comedy drama film co-written and directed by Martin Prakkat. It stars Mammootty, Sruthi Ramakrishnan, Nedumudi Venu, Lal, Salim Kumar, Vinayakan, Master Vivas, Sreenivasan, K. P. A. C. Lalitha, Master Sreedharan Nampoothiri and Sukumari. The film marks the debut of Prakatt as director. It was produced by Naushad under the banner of Big Screen. Several film directors made cameo appearances in the film. The film is all about the travails of a schoolteacher who dreams of being a film actor. It features cinematography by Ajayan Vincent, music by Bijibal and editing by Don Max.

Plot
Mohan is an upper primary school teacher who lives with his wife and their six-year-old son. He is actively involved in the cultural activities in his school and in his village too. His ambition is to act in films. Mohan is so besotted with his dream of becoming a star that he dresses and behaves like one. Although his colourful clothes and obsession with his looks invite the ridicule of his colleagues, his wife supports his aspirations. Then a film crew comes to the village for a shoot. Mohan makes several attempts to make his dream happen but certain incidents occur and the story takes a different turn.

On another occasion, Mohan meets a team of young filmmakers who ask him about his experience as an actor and inspire him by telling the story of Bollywood actor Vivek Oberoi who disguised himself and lived in Mumbai underworld slums to understand and learn the lifestyles of the actual gangsters. Inspired by this Mohan goes to Fort Kochi to learn about the underworld. Later he becomes a member of the gang led by Denver Aashan

Cast

Production
The filming began on 6 June 2010 in Ernakulam. The first schedule was completed in various parts of Amaravila and Thrippunithura Boys High School. Second and last schedule was held at Mattancherry from 5 August onwards. The filming was completed on 9 September, with some post-production activities left. The movie was earlier titled Oru Cinemakkatha. The heroine of the film is Kannada actress Sruthi Krishnan. The film marks her debut in Malayalam cinema.
According to Martin Prakatt, "This is not a cinema-within-cinema format, but it shows the world of movies from the point of view of an outsider".

Release
A preview of the film was held at AVM preview theatre in Chennai. Those who watched the preview said that "it is a light hearted comedy entertainer". The film released on 9 December 2010, in 78 theatres in Kerala and in another 12 theatres outside Kerala.

Reception

Critical response
Indiaglitz published a positive review saying "the movie really scores well with its fluid narratives and balancing of emotions. All in all, Mammootty and Martin Prakkat definitely have a winner in Best Actor. The movie which is almost sure to work well with the family audiences and the fans is definitely a right start for a promising director." Paresh C Palicha of Rediff rated the film 3 in a scale of 5 and commented that "the movie is watchable" and "has a very compelling feel good story." Nowrunning published an extreme positive review saying, "Best Actor is more than reason for celebration for fans of Mammootty. For the rest of us who would like to have a bit more than star charisma from his films, Martin Prakkatt has plenty to offer as well." Metromatinee also published a positive review saying, "Through Best Actor Martin Prakatt has plenty to offer as well. In his directorial debut Martin tells a simple story in a surprisingly imposing manner that does make us sit up and take note of his promising entry into films." Sify gave the movie a verdict of Above Average saying that, "Best Actor may not stir you up but could be fine, if you are there at the cinemas without much expectation. The film has its moments, but gives the feeling that it could have worked even better, if it had a better script and was approached with more passion." Reviewscreen also published a positive review and rated the film 4 in a scale of 5. They said that "The movie is a clean family entertainer. A total fun-filled movie with all the ingredients audience demanded. It is going to be one of the best movies of 2010." Mammootty received the Best Actor award from Asianet Film Awards while Nedumudi Venu won the Best Supporting Actor- Male.

Box office
The film was commercial success.

Soundtrack

The film score and songs were composed by Bijibal, with lyrics penned by Santhosh Varma and Sreerekha. The audio, consisting of five songs, was released by Manorama Music on 1 December 2010. The audio release function was held at Kadavu Resorts, Calicut and Mammootty presented the first copy to director V. M. Vinu.

References

External links 
 

2010s Malayalam-language films
2010 films
Indian comedy films
Films shot in Kochi
Films directed by Martin Prakkat